The Incognito Lounge is a sonnet by Denis Johnson and first published his collection The Incognito Lounge and Other Poems in 1982 by Random House. The poem has appeared in the Carnegie Mellon Classic Contemporary Series in 2008.

Critical appraisal
"The Incognito Lounge" is a sonnet composed of nine "strophes" or stanzas.

The poem, one of Johnson's fifteen published sonnets, exhibits a degree of fidelity to these traditional literary forms unusual to Johnson's oeuvre . Poet and critic Jay Deshpande writes:

Deshpande declares that "each sonnet is a crystalline example of what he gave to American letters." John Casteen identifies the urban landscape in which the poem unfolds:

Nicholas Niarchos notes that "The Incognito Lounge" is set "in an apartment block with a [narrator] who revels in sightlessness ("I go everywhere with my eyes closed and two / eyeballs painted on my face"). He inhabits a world "right slam on the brink of language," where things tend to meld into one another…" In describing the sonnet's first strophe or stanza, critic Richard Miklitsch observes that Johnson abandons "acoustics…metrics…rhyme and enjambment" in favor of "an obsessive image…in this case, one of the most intimate and seemingly familiar of images, the human face." In Johnson's hands, the face undergoes a number of astonishing permutations:

Miklitsch adds: "Johnson's imagination seems particularly suited to this kind of poem, one composed of seemingly self-contained anecdotes that, put together, produced a skewed but strangely satisfying story."

John Casteen discerns deeply reflexive conveyed through "The Incognito Lounge":

Footnotes

Sources 
 
 
 
 

1982 poems
American poems
Poetry by Denis Johnson